The Adventures of Pinocchio is a 1996 fantasy family film, directed by Steve Barron and based on the original 1883 novel of the same name by Carlo Collodi. Barron collaborated with Sherry Mills, Tom Bender and Barry Berman on the screenplay. The film was an American, British, French, Czech, and German venture produced by New Line Cinema, The Kushner-Locke Company, Savoy Pictures, Pangaea Holdings and Twin Continental Films. The film stars Martin Landau, Jonathan Taylor Thomas, Rob Schneider, Udo Kier, Bebe Neuwirth, David Doyle and Geneviève Bujold. The film was both a critical and commercial failure although a direct to video sequel was made.

Plot
In a forest, Italian woodcarver Geppetto carves a heart into a pine tree, expressing his secret love for a woman named Leona. When he leaves, a bolt of lightning strikes the tree, imbuing the heart with magic. Years later, Geppetto finds the remains of the tree and carves a marionette out of it, naming him Pinocchio. Due to the heart's magic, Pinocchio comes to life, referring to Geppetto as his father. Pinocchio chases a pigeon outside, meeting Leona, and then a pair of thieves, Volpe and Felinet, who work for Lorenzini, a sinister theater director and puppet master, informing him of Pinocchio's existence and sentience. Lorenzini tries to purchase Pinocchio, but Geppetto refuses to sell his son. Pinocchio climbs out of a window and wanders into town, joining a group of boys in school. He gets into a fight with the rowdy Lampwick, and when he lies about it, his nose grows longer and he is kicked out of the class. In sadness, Pinocchio ends up causing damage to a local bakery, and Geppetto is arrested as a result. Pinocchio flees home, meeting a talking cricket, Pepe, who tells Pinocchio to behave and stay out of trouble to become a real boy. The next day, Pinocchio and Geppetto are put on trial at court. Unless Geppetto pays a fine, he will be imprisoned. Lorenzini enters, offering to pay off the debt if Pinocchio is given over to him. Geppetto reluctantly agrees after being reminded of his poor state.

Pinocchio becomes the star of Lorenzini's productions, and is given gold coins as payment. However, Pepe helps him discover that he is ultimately unloved by Lorenzini. Pinocchio rescues several of Geppetto's puppets from being deliberately burnt by Lorenzini, unintentionally setting the theater on fire. He leaps into a river and flees to the forest, where he decides to live. Felinet and Volpe find him, swindling him out of his coins. Pinocchio spots a stage coach passing by, carrying Lampwick and other boys, travelling to Terra Magica, a hidden fun-fair for boys to do as they please. Meanwhile, Geppetto and Leona have been tracking down Pinocchio. Losing track of him, Geppetto rows out to sea, upon finding Pinocchio's hat on a beach. In the fun-fair, Pinocchio, Lampwick, and other boys go on a roller-coaster, but drinking the water of Terra Magica turns them into donkeys. The fun-fair turns out to belong to Lorenzini, who sells the donkeys off to circuses and farms. Pinocchio has Lampwick kick Lorenzini into the cursed water, transforming him into a sea monster and forcing him to flee into the ocean. The boys and donkeys escape the fun-fair, and Pinocchio reunites with Leona at the beach, as he sets out to find his father at sea.

Pinocchio and Pepe are consumed by the sea monster, reuniting with Geppetto inside his stomach. From the strong smell of rotten chili peppers, they try to escape up Lorenzini's throat; Pinocchio lies to extend his nose and make the passage larger, causing his nose to break. Lorenzini starts to choke, breaching the ocean top and spitting Geppetto and Pinocchio out in the process, before suffocating to death and sinking to the depths. On land, Pinocchio and Geppetto embrace. Pinocchio's tears flow, the tears landing on the heart carving, the same magic force from before transforming him into a real boy. The two embrace once more over the miracle. Pepe congratulates Pinocchio before leaving, wanting to rest from the whole ordeal, but promising they will see each other again soon.

On the way home back to the village, Pinocchio runs into Felinet and Volpe, whom he tricks them into going to Terra Magica and drinking the cursed water there; they are later revealed to have been transformed into a real cat and a fox, which results in them being captured by a farmer as new pets. They witness Pinocchio in town while lamenting their fate. The donkeys all transform back into boys by reforming. Geppetto and Leona marry, and Pinocchio gives his father a log he found, to carve into a girlfriend for him.

Cast

Live action
 Martin Landau as Geppetto, an impoverished Italian puppet maker who accidentally gives Pinocchio life after carving him from an enchanted log. He is initially reluctant to accept the puppet as his son, but warms up to him once he loses him.
 Jonathan Taylor Thomas as Pinocchio, the eponymous character and main protagonist of the film. He seeks to learn about right and wrong so that one day he will become a real boy.
 Geneviève Bujold as Leona, a friend of Geppetto with whom he is secretly in love – a love which is actually mutual, despite her having previously married his late brother. She serves as the Blue Fairy's stand-in in the film.
 Udo Kier as Lorenzini, an original character created for the film. He is an amalgamation of Mangiafuoco, The Coachman and The Terrible Dogfish. His fondness for chili peppers, which give him his somewhat fiery breath, is a homage to Mangiafuoco.
 Bebe Neuwirth as Felinet, a scheming con artist always looking for the next profit. Her name comes from the word "feline", meaning "cat". She and Volpe are based on the Fox and the Cat from the original novel. In the movie, Felinet is smarter than Volpe, while in the novel and in most adaptations, the Fox is smarter than the Cat.
 Rob Schneider as Volpe, Felinet's dim-witted partner and sidekick. His name is the Italian word for "fox". He and Felinet are based on the Fox and the Cat from the original novel.
 Corey Carrier as Lampwick. Unlike in the novel and the 1940 Disney version, Lampwick returns to being human and remains Pinocchio's best friend in the end, and affectionately calls him "Woody" even after they have both become real boys.
 Dawn French as the Baker's Wife. A shrew who works inside the bakery as director; she is like a little tea-pot (being short, stout, and full of steam enough to shout), though she does more damage to her shop than Pinocchio, she sways the court judge to rule in her favour.
 Richard Claxton as Saleo, Lampwick's companion and friend who kicks Pinocchio in class at school. He is turned into a donkey, along with Lampwick and another boy (Joe Swash), after drinking cursed water on Terra Magica's roller coaster. In the end, he reforms and returns to normal, along with all the other boys.
 John Sessions as the Professor, an irritable teacher who Pinocchio inadvertently annoys while attending one of his classes.
 Jerry Hadley as the Judge, a court official who threatens to send Geppetto to a debtors' prison for Pinocchio's irresponsible behavior.
 Jean-Claude Dreyfus as the Foreman

Voice cast
 Jonathan Taylor Thomas as the voice of Pinocchio, in his puppet form.
 Gary Martin as the Giant's voice
 Rob Schneider as the voice of Volpe, in his fox form.
 Bebe Neuwirth as the voice of Felinet, in her cat form. 
 David Doyle as the voice of Pepe, a talking cricket who serves as Pinocchio's conscience.

Puppeteers
 Mak Wilson as Pinocchio (lead animatronic puppeteer)
 Robert Tygner
 Michelan Sisti
 Bruce Lanoil as Pinocchio (principal puppeteer)
 William Todd-Jones
 Ian Tregonning

Development
Nearly ten years before the film was eventually made, Jim Henson and director Steve Barron were considering the idea of a live-action version of Pinocchio. They approached Disney with this idea, but Disney turned down the project. Years later, producer Lawrence Mortorff (President of Kushner Locke) sent Barron a script for a film based on the novel by Carlo Collodi. The project then finally got off the ground. For the character of Pinocchio, a complex animatronic puppet created by Jim Henson's Creature Shop was used with stop-motion. Framestore and Cinesite also provided the visual effects for the film.

Principal photography began on July 24, 1995, and wrapped on September 15, 1995. The film was shot in Croatia, Prague, Český Krumlov, and High Force. Pepe, the talking cricket, is computer-animated. One of the biggest changes in the filming was replacing Wallace Shawn with David Doyle, as the voice of Pepe. However, Shawn's voice as Pepe can still be heard in the trailer for the film, and he is even credited in the trailer.

The score by Rachel Portman features saxophone solos by David Roach.

Reception

Box office
The Adventures of Pinocchio was made on a budget of $25 million. The film had a poor performance in the United States, opening at #8 on its first week, then grossing $15,094,530 at the box office.

Critical reception
Critically, the film received a 35% rating on Rotten Tomatoes from 26 reviews with the consensus: "The Adventures of Pinocchio is an admirably faithful adaptation of the source material, but it may be too frightening for younger viewers - and too dull for older ones."

On the television review series Siskel & Ebert, Roger Ebert expressed disappointment with the film, while Gene Siskel praised the special effects, and remarked that he believed the film to be a faithful adaptation of the book, as opposed to Disney's interpretation, which strayed significantly from it. Ebert gave the film a two out of four stars and said, "The story is told with visual grace, but lacks excitement. Even Pinocchio's little cricket friend seems more like a philosopher than a ringmaster. Smaller children may be caught up by the wonder of it all, but older children may find the movie slow and old-fashioned." Joe Leydon of Variety gave the film a mostly positive review, writing "The Adventures of Pinocchio is a well-crafted and gently charming version of the classic 1883 novel by Carlo Collodi. Unfortunately, this live-action, non-musical adaptation must compete with vivid (and, in many cases, video-enhanced) memories of Disney's beloved 1940 animated feature."

In her seminar "The Persistent Puppet: Pinocchio's Heirs in Contemporary Fiction and Film", Rebecca West found The Adventures of Pinocchio to be relatively faithful to the original novel, although she noted major differences, such as the replacement of the Blue Fairy by the character of Leona. Lawrence Van Gelder of The New York Times, gave the film a negative review, writing "Despite the interesting differences between the latest Pinocchio, which mixes animated and live characters, and the wholly animated Disney version, the new film simply doesn't generate much magical enchantment."

Soundtrack

Sequel
A sequel was released in 1999 called The New Adventures of Pinocchio. Landau reprised his role as Geppetto, while Kier was recast as Lorenzini's estranged wife, Madame Flambeau (they were the only two actors to return in the film). Gabriel Thomson played the title role, replacing Jonathan Taylor Thomas. It was shot in Luxembourg City, Luxembourg.

References

External links

 
 
 
 

1996 animated films
1996 films
1990s children's fantasy films
1990s fantasy adventure films
American children's fantasy films
American fantasy adventure films
British children's fantasy films
British fantasy adventure films
Czech fantasy adventure films
Czech children's films
1990s English-language films
English-language Czech films
English-language French films
English-language German films
Puppet films
Films scored by Rachel Portman
Films directed by Steve Barron
Films set in Italy
Films set in the 19th century
French children's fantasy films
French fantasy adventure films
German children's fantasy films
German fantasy adventure films
Pinocchio films
Savoy Pictures films
New Line Cinema films
Warner Bros. films
PolyGram Filmed Entertainment films
The Kushner-Locke Company films
CineVox films
1990s American films
1990s British films
1990s French films
1990s German films